Charlie and Algernon is a musical with a book and lyrics by David Rogers and music by Charles Strouse. It is based on the 1966 novel Flowers for Algernon by Daniel Keyes. It received its premiere on 21 December 1978 at The Citadel Theater, in Edmonton, Canada.

Productions
On June 14, 1979, the musical opened titled Flowers for Algernon at Queen's Theatre in the West End with Michael Crawford as Charlie. In the West End staging, Michael Crawford performed one number in a spotlight while the trained white mouse ran from one of his hands to the other, by way of Crawford's shoulders and neck. The audience reaction to this was so positive that Crawford repeated it with another live mouse (while playing an entirely different character) in 2003 while starring in the West End musical The Woman in White.

The musical opened on Broadway at the Helen Hayes Theatre  September 14, 1980 and closed on September 28, 1980 after 17 performances and 12 previews.
Directed by Louis W. Scheeder and choreographed by Virginia Freeman, the cast featured P. J. Benjamin (Charlie) and Sandy Faison.

Charlie and Algernon was nominated for the 1981 Tony Award for Best Original Score. A London cast album was released on the Original Cast Records label.

In October 2016, Marymount Manhattan College and The York Theatre Company mounted a staged musical reading of the original "Charlie and Algernon", directed by composer Charles Strouse's spouse, Barbara Siman and featured Ian Morel, Mia Massaro, Alex Burnette, and Brent Jones. Music Direction was by Brett Kristofferson.

Overview
The title characters are a developmentally challenged man and a laboratory mouse, respectively. Charlie volunteers to participate in an experimental intelligence-enhancing treatment, and his rapid progress parallels that of Algernon, who had been treated earlier. When the mouse's enhanced intelligence begins to fade, Charlie realizes he too is fated to revert to his original mental state.

West End song list
His Name is Charlie Gordon
I Got a Friend
Some Bright Morning
Our Boy Charlie
Hey Look at Me!
Reading
No Surprises
Midnight Riding
Dream Safe With Me 
I Can't Tell You
Now
Charlie and Algernon
The Maze
Whatever Time There Is
Charlie
I Really Loved You

Broadway song list       
Have I the Right
I Got a Friend
Some Bright Morning
Jelly Donuts and Chocolate Cake
Hey Look at Me
Reading
No Surprises
Midnight Riding
Dream Safe with Me
Not Another Day Like This
Somebody New
I Can't Tell You
Now
Charlie and Algernon
The Maze
Whatever Time There Is
Everything Was Perfect
Charlie
I Really Loved You
Whatever Time There Is (Reprise)

References

External links
 Musical Notes, synopsis and details of the musical
 Internet Broadway Database entry
 Flowers for Algernon song list 

1979 musicals
West End musicals
Broadway musicals
Musicals based on novels
Musicals by Charles Strouse